Søren Østergaard (born 11 May 1957, in Esbjerg) is a Danish film, television and stage actor.

Selected filmography
 Facing the Truth (2002)
 Pain of Love (1992)

Awards
 Bodil Award for Best Actor for Pain of Love (1993)

External links 

 
 Søren Østergaard at the Danish Film Institute
 Biography at Agenzy A/S

1957 births
Danish male actors
Best Actor Bodil Award winners
People from Esbjerg
Living people
Best Actor Robert Award winners